The Vista class is a class of Panamax-type cruise ships, built by Fincantieri Marghera shipyard, in Italy. Vista-class cruise ships are operated by Holland America Line, P&O Cruises, Cunard Line, Costa Cruises, and Carnival Cruise Line.The ships are equipped with a diesel-electric power plant and an Azipod propulsion system. The ships are designed so that eighty-five percent of the staterooms have ocean views and sixty-seven percent have verandas; the extensive use of glass in the superstructure of Vista-class ships is also reflected in the class name.

History
The Vista-class design was originally created for Holland America Line, using the Panamax guidelines to determine their designed size. A fifth hull which was originally intended for Holland America was transferred to Cunard Line in 2003 where it was planned to become .

Derivative designs

Signature class
The second derivative design is Holland America Line's Signature-class cruise ship, .  While the same length as MS Noordam, she has one more deck than the standard Vista-class design, and her public areas and cabin placement have been significantly redesigned, especially on her upper-most decks. A second Signature-class ship, entered service in 2010.

Hybrid Vista/Spirit class
In 2007 Cunard took delivery of Queen Victoria the first ship in a class described as a hybrid design "taking the best parts from Aker Yards'  built Costa Atlantica and Costa Mediterranea, and from Holland America's Vista class ships". Subsequent ships based on this hybrid design include
Costa's Costa Luminosa, Cunard's , and Costa Deliziosa.

The Cunard ships had a few additional changes including a stronger bow for direct transatlantic crossings, something Cunard ships have completed more regularly than typical cruise ships; and a large second balcony area over the Queens Room dance floor which is one of Cunard's signature features.

Ships by delivery date

2002: 
2003: 
2004: 
2005: 
2006: 
2007: 
2009: Carnival Luminosa
2010: 
2010: Costa Deliziosa

Superseded by:
Vista Spirit hybrid class cruise ship

Similar ships
 , a similar class of Panamax ships operated by Carnival Cruise Line.
 , a similar class of Panamax ships operated by Royal Caribbean International
 Signature-class cruise ship, a similar class of Panamax ships operated by Holland America Line
 , a similar class of new-Panamax ships operated by Holland America Line

References

External links

 
 
 

Cruise ship classes
Ships of the Holland America Line
Panamax cruise ships
Fincantieri